Edward Appleton may refer to:

 Edward Victor Appleton (1892–1965), English physicist
Ed Appleton (1892–1932), American baseball player